Iambic tetrameter is a poetic meter in ancient Greek and Latin poetry; as the name of a rhythm, iambic tetrameter consists of four metra, each metron being of the form | x – u – |, consisting of a spondee and an iamb, or two iambs. There usually is a break in the centre of the line, thus the whole line is:

| x – u – | x – u – || x – u – || x – u – |

("x" is a syllable that can be long or short, "–" is a long syllable, and "u" is a short one.)

In modern English poetry, it refers to a line consisting of four iambic feet.  The word "tetrameter" simply means that there are four feet in the line; iambic tetrameter is a line comprising four iambs, defined by accent. The scheme is thus:

  x  /  x  /  x  /  x  /  

Some poetic forms rely upon the iambic tetrameter, for example triolet, Onegin stanza, In Memoriam stanza, long measure (or long meter) ballad stanza.

Quantitative verse

In Medieval Latin
The term iambic tetrameter originally applied to the quantitative meter of Classical Greek poetry, in which an iamb consisted of a short syllable followed by a long syllable. Two iambs, or a spondee and an iamb, were joined together to make a "metron". In Greek and Latin iambic poetry the first syllable of each iambic metron could optionally be long instead of short.

An example in Latin is the hymn Aeterne rerum conditor composed in the 4th century by St Ambrose, which begins:
"Eternal Creator of (all) things,
Who rulest the night and day"

The two lines above consist of the following rhythm, and joined together make a tetrameter:

 | – – u – | – – u – |
 | – – u – | u – u – |

Latin poetry was quantitative, i.e. based on syllable length not stress accent, and in places the word-accent does not match the metrical accent (e.g.  and ). In Ambrose's hymn, there is a strong break at the end of each half of the tetrameter, so that it is usual to write the two halves of the verse on separate lines.

In early Latin

The iambic tetrameter was one of the metres used in the comedies of Plautus and Terence in the early period of Latin literature (2nd century BC). This kind of tetrameter is also known as the iambic octonarius, because it has eight iambic feet. There were two varieties. One had a break at the end of the second metron as in Ambrose's hymn. In some lines, however, such as the following from Terence, the break came after the 9th, not the 8th, metrical position:

!
"But you on the other hand now seem to me to be lucky, Phaedria!"

| – – uu – | – – u – | u – – – | – u – |

There was usually therefore quite a strong match between word accent and rhythm, as in the line above.

A variation on this metre was the iambic septenarius, or iambic tetrameter catalectic. This was similar but with the last syllable omitted. The example below also comes from Terence:

But what's this? Do I see Geta running to arrive here?
| – uu – uu | – uu u – || – – – – | u – – |

The final syllable of the line could be long or short, but every final syllable counted as long by the principle known as brevis in longo.

Accentual-syllabic verse

The term iambic tetrameter was adopted to describe a similar metre in accentual-syllabic verse, as composed in English, German, Russian, and other languages.  Here, iamb refers to an unstressed syllable followed by a stressed syllable. A line of iambic tetrameter consists of four such feet in a row:

da DUM da DUM da DUM da DUM

Examples

English
  ×    /    ×    / ×    /  ×  /
 Come live with me and be my love

(Christopher Marlowe, "The Passionate Shepherd to His Love")

German
  ×    /   ×  /    × /  ×       /
 Dies Bildnis ist bezaubernd schön

(Emanuel Schikaneder, libretto to The Magic Flute)

Hebrew
 × /  × /  ×  /   × /
 Adon Olam Asher Malach

(the opening line of Adon Olam, a traditional hymn of anonymous authorship from the Jewish liturgy.)

See also

Syllable weight
Iambic pentameter

Notes

Types of verses